Chitral Model College is a private graduate college in Chitral. The college is ranked as one of the top colleges in Khyber Pakhtunkhwa, Pakistan. Admissions to the college begin every July. The number of students enrolled has increased every year since the College's establishment in 2001. The College upgraded to degree level in 2005 and relocated to a new building in 2008. It is situated near Polo Ground Chitral. 

Yar Muhammad Khan is the current Principal of Chitral Model College.

References

Educational institutions established in 2001
2001 establishments in Pakistan